The Rosetta Foundation is a non-profit organization that promotes social localization, the process of making social services information available to individuals around the world in their native languages.

The Rosetta Foundation was registered as a charitable organization in Ireland. It was an offshoot of the Localization Research Centre (LRC) at the University of Limerick, Ireland, and of the Centre for Next Generation Localization (CNGL), a research initiative supported by the Irish government.

The Rosetta Foundation developed the Service-Oriented Localization Architecture Solution (SOLAS), whereby volunteer translators and not-for-profit organizations contribute to the translation and distribution of materials for language localization. The first preview of Translation Exchange, now called SOLAS Match, was given on 17 May 2011; the first pilot project using SOLAS Match was launched on 20 October 2012. The Rosetta Foundation launched the Translation Commons (or "Trommons") on 18 May 2013.

On 15 June 2017, the Rosetta Foundation merged with Translators without Borders (TWB). The two now operate jointly under the TWB name. This merger was announced at a Localization World conference in Barcelona.

Origin of name
The foundation was named after the Rosetta Stone.

Goals and aims
The Rosetta foundation aims to provide infrastructure for translation and localization, and to use this to remove language barriers and provide access to information. Their goal is that this access to information will relieve poverty, support healthcare and develop education.

The Rosetta Foundation aimed to provide information to as many people as possible in their languages. The core concept was outlined in a paper published by organization founder Reinhard Schaler: Information Sharing across Languages.

History

European launch
The European launch occurred at the AGIS '09 conference in Limerick, Ireland, from 21–23 September 2009.  The president of the University of Limerick, Don Barry, announced the launch of the Rosetta Foundation on 21 September 2009 during his welcoming address to the AGIS '09 delegates. AGIS, Action for Global Information Sharing, provided an opportunity for volunteer translators, localization specialists, and NGOs to come together to learn, network and celebrate their work.

North American launch
The North American launch took place at the Localization World conference in Santa Clara, California, on 20 October 2009.  This pre-conference workshop provided an overview of the organizational structure, the aims and objectives, and the strategic plan of the Rosetta Foundation. Participants were introduced to the Foundation’s translation and localization technology platform, GlobalSight.

International No Language Barrier Day
In 2012, The Rosetta Foundation declared 19 April the international "No Language Barrier Day." The day is meant to raise international awareness that it is not languages that represent barriers but rather access to translation services that is the barrier preventing communities from accessing and sharing information across languages. The annual celebration of this day aims to raise awareness about and grow global community translation efforts. One example is the BBB Volunteer Interpretation Service, which helps communication in Korea, and Interpreters Without Borders from Babel verse.

Translation Commons (Trommons)
On 18 May 2013, the Rosetta Foundation launched the Translation Commons or  Trommons. Trommons was an open, non-profit space for those offering free community language services. Trommons was powered by the Service-Oriented Localization Architecture Solution (SOLAS). The Rosetta Foundation switched over overproduction on 8 May 2013, attracting language communities from 44 countries within hours.

Social Localisation 
The concept of "Social Localization" was introduced by Reinhard Schaler, director of the Localization Research Centre at the University of Limerick, at a particular Localization World Silicon Valley session on 10 October 2011. The main objective of social localization is to promote a demand rather than a supply-driven approach to localization. Social localization supports user-driven and needs-based localization scenarios. The Rosetta Foundation launched its initiative at a special event in Dublin on 27 October 2011 with volunteers, partner organizations, and funders.

Areas of activity
The Rosetta Foundation supports not-for-profit activities of the localization and translation communities. It works with those who want equal access to information across languages, independent of economic or market considerations, including localization and translation companies, technology developers, and not-for-profit and non-governmental organizations. The objective is to cater to translations requirements beyond those services offered by mainstream translation service providers and user communities on the ground.

Technology platform
The Rosetta Foundation is actively involved in developing GlobalSight and Crowdsight. Both systems are open source systems originally developed by Transware and then moved into the open-source space by their new owners We localize in early 2009. Sponsored by We localize, GlobalSight is an open-source Globalization Management System (GMS) that helps automate tasks associated with the creation, translation, review, storage, and management of global content. CrowdSight is another open-source application fully integrated with GlobalSight. It is used specifically to engage the right community to deliver a quick-turn translation for on-demand content. The GlobalSight community has over 1,500 members.

The first preview of Translation eXchange (now SOLAS Match), a significant component developed as part of The Rosetta Foundation technology platform in collaboration with the Centre for Next Generation Localization (CNGL), was given in a webinar by Reinhard Schaler and Eoin O Conchúir on 17 May 2011. SOLAS Match was developed at the University of Limerick and is based on ideas developed at the Rosetta Foundation Design Fest in San Francisco, 5–6 February 2012, by around 25 localization experts. SOLAS Match matches translation projects with volunteers' expertise and interests.

SOLAS based on ORM design principles
SOLAS consists of SOLAS Match (matching projects and volunteers) and SOLAS Productivity (a suite of translation productivity tools and technologies). SOLAS was originally developed as part of the Next Generation Localization research track of the CNGL at the University of Limerick. SOLAS Match has been released under an open-source GPL license and can be downloaded from the SOLAS web page. SOLAS Productivity currently consists of six components, all sharing an XLIFF-based common data layer:
 Workflow Recommender (workflow optimization)
 Localization Knowledge Repository (source language checking)
 XLIFF Phoenix (re-use of metadata)
 MT-Mapper (identification of suitable MT engine)
 LocConnect (orchestration of components)

International advisory committee

Board of directors

The Non-profit Technology Enterprise Network
In March 2010, The Rosetta Foundation became a member of the Non-profit Technology Enterprise Network (NTEN), a membership organization made up of individuals, non-profit and for-profit organizations which seeks to support non-profit organizations in their use of technology to fulfil their missions.

See also

 Internationalization and localization
 Globalization
 Association without lucrative purpose
 Community Organizations
 Master of Nonprofit Organizations
 Mutual organization
 Non-governmental organization (NGO)
 Non-profit organizations and access to public information
 Nonprofit technology
 Occupational safety and health
 Social economy
 Supporting organization (charity)
 :Category:Nonprofit organizations

Notes

External links 
 Non-profit Technology Community
 Globalization and Localization Association (GALA)
 Localization World Conference
 Localisation Research Centre
 Mozilla Localization Project
 I18nguy: Internationalization (I18n), Localization (L10n), Standards, and Amusements

References

Non-profit technology
 Non-profit organisations based in the Republic of Ireland
 Organisations based in Dublin (city)
 Organizations established in 2009
Translation organizations